Lake Nemi (also called Diana's Mirror) is a small circular volcanic lake in the Lazio region of Italy  south of Rome, taking its name from Nemi, the largest town in the area, that overlooks it from a height.

Archaeology and history
The lake is famous for its sunken Roman ships.  These ships were very large and technologically advanced for their time.

The lake was sacred to the goddess Diana Nemorensis and the site of the festival Nemoralia. Near the sanctuary of Diana were found a number of diminutive bronze statues of draped women and men, each holding libation bowls and incense boxes. Four of these figures are now in the British Museum's collection. Emperors Caligula and Tiberius sailed Lake Nemi not merely to cool off in summer, but to assert themselves as Nemorensis, rulers aligning with the Stars, wedded to Earth's perpetual life-force.

Near the temple of Diana was the sacred grove of Aricia. Here there was a priest called the Rex Nemorensis who would reign until he was killed by a challenger. This practice is described in the opening chapter of The Golden Bough by James George Frazer.

At the Hotel Diana, on the Western edge of the crater at Via Nemorense, there is a fine exhibit of the archeological excavation of the late 1920s, which exposed the enormous structure which Caligula built.

Art and literature

 Lake Nemi has been the subject for works by such artists as John Robert Cozens, George Inness, and Pierre-Henri de Valenciennes.  
Muriel Spark's 1976 novel The Takeover is set in three fictitious villas overlooking Lake Nemi.
Lake Nemi inspired the first name of Norwegian comic character Nemi Montoya.
The lake and its surroundings are featured in the game Assassin's Creed Brotherhood wherein the title character destroys a war machine commissioned by the work's antagonist Cesare Borgia and invented by Leonardo da Vinci.
Mussolini led the effort to locate Caligula's devotional barges sunk 2000 years ago in Lake Nemi, see TheNYTimes April 9, 1908, then April 26, 1926, April 10, 1927, Feb 4, 1929
Featured in Lindsey Davis' 2007 historical mystery crime novel Saturnalia (Davis novel)

See also

Alban Hills
Lake of Albano
Nemi
Genzano di Roma
Ariccia
Rex Nemorensis
Diana Nemorensis
The Golden Bough
Nemi ships

References

External links

 Nemi Ships
 Nemi to Nottingham project

 
Lake Nemi
Calderas of Italy
Volcanic crater lakes
Lakes of Lazio
Sacred lakes
Volcanic lakes of Italy
Diana (mythology)